Gillingham Friary was possibly a Dominican friary in the town of Gillingham, Dorset, England.

References

External links 
 

Monasteries in Dorset
Gillingham, Dorset